Yoo Min-hyeon (born September 27, 1994) is a South Korean male curler.

Teams

Men's

Mixed

Mixed doubles

References

External links

Video: 

Living people
1994 births
Sportspeople from Gangwon Province, South Korea
South Korean male curlers
Pacific-Asian curling champions
Asian Games medalists in curling
Curlers at the 2017 Asian Winter Games
Medalists at the 2017 Asian Winter Games
Asian Games bronze medalists for South Korea
Curlers at the 2012 Winter Youth Olympics
21st-century South Korean people